Elachista bazaensis is a moth of the family Elachistidae that is found in Spain.

References

bazaensis
Moths described in 1990
Endemic fauna of Spain
Moths of Europe